Stephen K. Kohlscheen (born September 20, 1988) is a former American professional baseball pitcher. He played in Minor League Baseball for the Milwaukee Brewers' organization.

Career
Kohlscheen attended Norman North High School in Norman, Oklahoma. The Florida Marlins selected him in the 43rd round of the 2007 MLB Draft, but he opted not to sign. He enrolled at Cowley County Community College in Arkansas City, Kansas, and was selected by the Philadelphia Phillies in the 30th round of the 2009 MLB Draft. Again, he chose not to sign. He transferred to Auburn University to play for the Auburn Tigers baseball team. With Auburn, Kohlscheen, had a 1-0 win–loss record, two saves, and a 6.49 earned run average (ERA) in 17 appearances. He was drafted in the 45th round of the 2010 MLB Draft by the Seattle Mariners, and he chose to sign.

In 2014, the Mariners invited Kohlscheen to spring training as a non-roster player. They assigned Kohlscheen to the Jackson Generals of the Class AA Southern League, where he was named to appear in the league's all-star game. He was promoted to the Tacoma Rainiers of the Class AAA Pacific Coast League (PCL). Between Jackson and Tacoma, Kohlscheen pitched to a combined 3-1 win–loss record with a 2.70 ERA and 55 strikeouts against 10 walks. On July 31, 2014, the Mariners traded Kohlscheen and Abraham Almonte to the San Diego Padres for Chris Denorfia. The Padres assigned him to the El Paso Chihuahuas of the PCL.

Personal life
Kohlscheen's father, Brian, works as a scouting supervisor for the Phillies.

References

External links

Living people
1988 births
People from York, Nebraska
Sportspeople from Norman, Oklahoma
Baseball players from Nebraska
Baseball players from Oklahoma
Baseball pitchers
Pulaski Mariners players
Clinton LumberKings players
Everett AquaSox players
High Desert Mavericks players
Jackson Generals (Southern League) players
Tacoma Rainiers players
El Paso Chihuahuas players
Cowley Tigers baseball players
Auburn Tigers baseball players
Leones del Escogido players
American expatriate baseball players in the Dominican Republic
San Antonio Missions players
Biloxi Shuckers players
Colorado Springs Sky Sox players